Kamilla Aliyeva (born 3 April 2006)  is an Azerbaijani group rhythmic gymnast. She is the 2022 World 3 ribbons + 2 balls bronze medalist and 2022 European group All-Around, 5 hoops and 3 ribbons and 2 balls bronze medalist.

Career 
Aliyeva took up the sport at age six after her grandmother saw her walk on her tiptoes and do movements that looked like gymnastics.

Kamilla became age-eligible for senior competition in 2022 and became part of the national group. Between April and May she competed at two World Cups, Baku where the group won gold with 5 hoops and silver in the All-Around, and Pamplona where they won two bronze medals in the two event finals. Then at the European Championships in Tel Aviv, the Azerbaijani group won the bronze medals in the group All-Around, 5 hoops, and 3 ribbons + 2 balls.

She represented Azerbaijan at the 2021 Islamic Solidarity Games where the Azerbaijani group won the gold medal in the all-around. Then in the event finals, they won gold in 3 ribbons + 2 balls and silver in 5 hoops behind Uzbekistan. Aliyeva also competed at the 2022 World Championships alongside Laman Alimuradova, Gullu Aghalarzade, Zeynab Hummatova, Yelyzaveta Luzan, and Darya Sorokina. In the 3 ribbons + 2 balls final, the group won the bronze medal behind Bulgaria and Italy. This marked the first time an Azerbaijani group won a medal at the Rhythmic Gymnastics World Championships.

References 

Living people
2006 births
Azerbaijani rhythmic gymnasts
Sportspeople from Baku
Medalists at the Rhythmic Gymnastics European Championships
Medalists at the Rhythmic Gymnastics World Championships
21st-century Azerbaijani women